George Hamilton Chichester, 3rd Marquess of Donegall  (10 February 1797 – 20 October 1883), styled Viscount Chichester until 1799 and Earl of Belfast between 1799 and 1844, was an Anglo-Irish landowner, courtier and politician. He served as Vice-Chamberlain of the Household from 1830 to 1834, as well as from 1838 to 1841, and as Captain of the Yeomen of the Guard between 1848 and 1852. Ennobled in his own right in 1841, he was also Lord Lieutenant of Antrim from 1841 to 1883 and was made a Knight of St Patrick in 1857.

Background and education
Lord Donegall was born at Great Cumberland Place, London, the eldest son of Viscount Chichester (who became The 2nd Marquess of Donegall in 1799) by his wife Anna May, daughter of Sir Edward May, 2nd Baronet. He was educated at Eton and Christ Church, Oxford, before serving for a time as a captain with the 11th Hussars. He was known by the courtesy title Viscount Chichester from birth until 1799 and as Earl of Belfast from 1799 to 1844.

Political career
In 1818, Lord Belfast (as he was from 1799 until 1844) was elected to the House of Commons as Member of Parliament (MP) for Carrickfergus, and two years later became representative for Belfast. In July 1830 he was sworn of the Privy Council and appointed Vice-Chamberlain of the Household in The Duke of Wellington's Tory administration. In August he was returned to Parliament for Antrim. He continued as Vice-Chamberlain after Lord Grey formed his Whig government in November 1830. In 1831 he was made a Knight Grand Cross of the Royal Guelphic Order. He remained as Vice-Chamberlain until 1834, the last months under the premiership of Lord Melbourne. In 1837 he was once again returned to Parliament for Belfast. He did not initially serve in Melbourne's second administration, but in 1838 he once again became Vice-Chamberlain of the Household. He resigned when the government fell in 1841, and during the same year he unsuccessfully contested Belfast as a Liberal candidate. He was instead raised to the Peerage of the United Kingdom in his own right as Baron Ennishowen and Carrickfergus, of Ennishowen in the County of Donegal and of Carrickfergus in the County of Antrim. He sat in the House of Lords at Westminster for three years under this title before succeeding his father in the marquessate in 1844.

Lord Donegall did not serve initially in Lord John Russell's first administration, but in 1848 he returned to the government as Captain of the Yeomen of the Guard. He resigned along with the rest of the Whig government in early 1852. Apart from his political career he was also Lord Lieutenant of Antrim from 1841 to 1883. In 1857 he was made a Knight of the Order of St Patrick. At the time of his death in 1883 he was the senior member of the Privy Council.

Family
Lord Donegall married Lady Harriet Anne Butler (d. 1860), daughter of The 1st Earl of Glengall, in 1822. They had three children:

Lady Harriet Augusta Anna Seymourina Chichester (d. 14 April 1898); married The 8th Earl of Shaftesbury.
George Augustus Chichester, Viscount Chichester (26 May 1826 – 18 June 1827)
Frederick Richard Chichester, Earl of Belfast (25 November 1827 – 11 February 1853); died in Naples, unmarried.

After his first wife's death in September 1860, he married as his second wife Harriett Graham (d. 1884), daughter of Sir Bellingham Reginald Graham, 7th Baronet, and widow of Sir Frederick Ashworth, in 1862. There were no children from this marriage. Lord Donegall died in Brighton, Sussex, in October 1883, aged 86, and was buried in Belfast. 

As both his sons had predeceased him, the larger part of the Donegall estates was inherited by his only daughter, Harriet Ashley-Cooper, Lady Ashley (later Countess of Shaftesbury and previously Lady Harriet Augusta Anna Seymourina Chichester), wife of The 8th Earl of Shaftesbury. 

The Barony of Ennishowen and Carrickfergus died with him, while he was succeeded in the marquessate by his younger brother, Lord Edward Chichester. The Marchioness of Donegall died in March 1884.

References

External links

1797 births
1883 deaths
11th Hussars officers
Alumni of Christ Church, Oxford
Knights of St Patrick
Members of the Privy Council of the United Kingdom
Chichester, George
Chichester, George
Chichester, George
Chichester, George
Chichester, George
Chichester, George
Chichester, George
Chichester, George
UK MPs who inherited peerages
UK MPs who were granted peerages
People educated at Eton College
Lord-Lieutenants of Antrim
George
Members of the Parliament of the United Kingdom for County Antrim constituencies (1801–1922)
Members of the Parliament of the United Kingdom for Belfast constituencies (1801–1922)
3
Peers of the United Kingdom created by Queen Victoria
Tory MPs (pre-1834)